Dare Wright (December 3, 1914 – January 25, 2001) was a Canadian–American children's author, model, and photographer. She is best known for her 1957 children's book, The Lonely Doll.

Early life
Wright was born in the Thornhill section of Vaughan, Ontario, Canada, but spent her childhood in the United States, growing up in Cleveland, Ohio. Her parents divorced when she was young, and she was raised by her mother, the portrait artist Edith Stevenson Wright, while her brother, Blaine, went to live with his father, Ivan Wright, a theater critic in New York City. The siblings did not meet again until Dare moved to New York City in her twenties. Wright spent her formative years in Cleveland Heights.

Wright graduated from Laurel School in Shaker Heights in 1933 at the top of her class, and relocated to New York to attend the American Academy of Dramatic Arts. In 1935, she was cast in a small role as a maid in a stage production of Pride and Prejudice, which she performed in Washington, D.C. and on Broadway.

Career
In 1957, she photographed her childhood Lenci doll, Edith, along with two teddy bears bought at FAO Schwarz, for her first children's book, titled The Lonely Doll. The book made The New York Times Best Seller list for children's books. In November 2010, The British Newspaper The Guardian named The Lonely Doll one of the 10 Best Illustrated Children's Books of all time. It was followed by eighteen other stories. Out of print for many years, it was reissued in 1998, introducing Wright to a new generation of readers. Another children's work, Lona: A Fairy Tale, features photographs of Wright herself dressed as a fairy princess, while using another doll in identical costume to give the illusion that Wright's character has been "transformed" to doll-size by a wicked wizard. Make Me Real, which features another of Wright's childhood dolls, and Ocracoke in The Fifties, her only book written for adults, have been published posthumously.

Dare Wright's photographs were exhibited for the first time in 2012 by Fred Torres Collaborations.

Personal life
Throughout her adulthood, Wright remained close to her mother and never married despite receiving a number of proposals. Her brother, to whom she also was very attached, was estranged from their mother.  Her mother died in 1975 and her brother in 1985.   She was admitted to Goldwater Memorial Hospital on Roosevelt Island in May 1995 after suffering respiratory failure. She remained hospitalized for the next five and a half years until she died on January 25, 2001, at the age of 86.

Bibliography

Books still in print
 The Lonely Doll. Doubleday, (2013) First time issued in paperback.
 Holiday for Edith and the Bears. Dare Wright Media (2013)
 The Doll and the Kitten. Dare Wright Media (2013)
 Lona a Fairy Tale. Dare Wright Media (2013)
 Edith and the Duckling. Dare Wright Media (2013)
 Edith and Midnight. Dare Wright Media (2013)
 Edith and Mr. Bear. Dare Wright Media (2013)
 A Gift from the Lonely Doll. Dare Wright Media (2013) - "Wright's signature b&w photographs evoke a voyeuristic feel."
 The Lonely Doll Learns a Lesson. Dare Wright Media (2013)

Posthumously published
 Make Me Real. Xlibris. (2007) (self-published)
 Ocracoke in the Fifties. John F. Blair, (2006)

References

Notes

Sources

External links

Official website
This American Life episode
Toronto author’s heir wants to revive interest in her once famous children’s books about The Lonely Doll
A Girl, Her Doll and Her Mom-Principals in a Creepy Drama
 Finding aid to Jean Nathan papers on Dare Wright at Columbia University. Rare Book & Manuscript Library.

1914 births
2001 deaths
American children's writers
Female models from Ohio
20th-century American photographers
Canadian emigrants to the United States
Deaths from respiratory failure
Writers from Cleveland
People from Cleveland Heights, Ohio
American women children's writers
20th-century American women